The King Abdullah II 3rd Armored Division (Arabic:3 فرقة الملك عبدالله الثاني المدرعة) is a former armored division in Jordanian Armed Forces, active from 1969 to 2018.

History 
The Division was equipped and trained for high-intensity combat against highly organized enemies as well as peacekeeping missions.

The Division functioned as the Jordanian strategic reserve and was deployed between Zarqa, to the northeast of Amman, to Qatraneh in the south on near Saudi Arabia.

Since Qatraneh has a strategic position vis-a-vis the attack routes along the Dead Sea, the 40th Armored Brigade was usually based there.

In the 1973 Yom Kippur War, the 40th Armoured Brigade was sent to the Syrian front and played a significant role in the fighting.

King Abdullah II became Battalion Commander of the Second Royal Armored Battalion – 40th Armored Brigade in January 1992. In 1993, he was in the 40th Armored Brigade with the rank of Colonel.

This Division was involved in the 1948 Arab–Israeli War, reprisal operations, the Six-Day War, the Battle of Karameh, the War of Attrition, Black September and the Yom Kippur War.

In 2018, the 3rd Armored Division HQ with many support units and one armored brigade (91st) has been deactivated, the remaining two armored brigades (40th, 60th) and some units merged with Jordanian Central Command.

Organisation 
The Division is deployed between Zarqa, to the northeast of Amman to Qatraneh in the south on the way to Saudi Arabia.

Units 
 Division Command HQ – (Deactivated in 2018)
 3rd Royal Communication Group – (merged with Central Command Communication Group in 2018)
 Field Reconnaissance Battalion (Army Knights) – (Transferred to Directorate of Joint Military Operations)
 King Hussein 40th Armored Brigade – (Transferred to Central Command in 2018)
 Brigade HQ
 Signal Company
 Prince Hussein bin Abdullah II 1st Armored Infantry Battalion (IFV)
 2nd Royal Tank Battalion
 Prince Ali bin Al Hussein 4th Tank Battalion
 Services Companies
 Medical Company
 Brigade Maintenance Workshop
 Prince Hassan 60th Armored Brigade – (Transferred to Central Command in 2018)
 Brigade HQ
 Signal Company
 Royal Guard 3rd Armored Infantry Battalion (IFV)
 3rd Royal Tank Battalion
 5th Royal Tank Battalion
 Services Companies
 Medical Company
 Brigade Maintenance Workshop
 91st Royal Armored Brigade – (Deactivated in 2018)
 Brigade HQ
 Signal Company
 King Ali 5th Armored Infantry Battalion (IFV) - (Transferred to Central Command in 2018)
 10th Royal Tank Battalion
 11th Royal Tank Battalion
 Services Companies
 Medical Company
 Brigade Maintenance Workshop
 Division Artillery – (Merged with Central command in 2018)
 Division Artillery HQ
 2nd SP Artillery Battalion
 7th SP Artillery Battalion
 23rd SP Artillery Battalion
 24th Heavy Artillery Battalion (Deactivated in 2018)
 3rd Royal Field AD Group – (Merged with Central Command in 2018)
 Group HQ
 Signal Company
 4th Field AD Battalion (Transferred to Southern Command in 2018)
 73rd Field AD Battalion
 Division Engineer Battalion (Merged with Central command in 2018)
 Supply & Transport Battalion (Merged with Central command in 2018)
 Administrative Transport Group – (Deactivated in 2018)
 Medical Support Group – (Merged with Central command in 2018)
 Construction Group – (Deactivated in 2018)
 Maintenance Group – (Merged with Central command in 2018)
 Division Training Center – (Deactivated in 2018)

Unit summary

References 

Military of Jordan
Military units and formations of Jordan
Military units and formations established in 1969
Military units and formations disestablished in 2018